North West Surrey Synagogue is a Reform Jewish community whose synagogue is on Oatlands Drive in Weybridge, Surrey, England. The community, which now consists of 300 families, was founded in 1956 and is affiliated to the Movement for Reform Judaism.

The synagogue's current rabbi (since 2017) is Kath Vardi. Its previous rabbis have included Tony Bayfield (1969–1982), Frederick Morgan (1984–1997), Jackie Tabick (1999–2013) and Dr David Zucker (2013–2017).

See also
 List of Jewish communities in the United Kingdom
 List of former synagogues in the United Kingdom
 Movement for Reform Judaism

References

External links
 Official website

1956 establishments in England
Reform synagogues in the United Kingdom
Weybridge, Surrey
Religion in Surrey